Acantholysis is the loss of intercellular connections, such as desmosomes, resulting in loss of cohesion between keratinocytes, seen in diseases such as pemphigus vulgaris. It is absent in bullous pemphigoid, making it useful for differential diagnosis.

This histological feature is also seen in herpes simplex infections (HSV 1 and 2) and varicella zoster infections (chicken pox and shingles).

See also 
 Skin lesion
 Skin disease
 List of cutaneous conditions

References

External links 

Dermatologic terminology